Ibou Faye (born December 13, 1969) is a retired Senegalese athlete who mainly competed in the 400 metres hurdles.

Competition record

References

External links

1969 births
Living people
Senegalese male hurdlers
Athletes (track and field) at the 1996 Summer Olympics
Athletes (track and field) at the 2000 Summer Olympics
Olympic athletes of Senegal
African Games gold medalists for Senegal
African Games medalists in athletics (track and field)
Athletes (track and field) at the 1995 All-Africa Games
Athletes (track and field) at the 1999 All-Africa Games
Athletes (track and field) at the 2003 All-Africa Games
Ibou
20th-century Senegalese people